Aegires palensis is a species of sea slug, a nudibranch, a marine, opisthobranch gastropod mollusk in the family Aegiridae.

Distribution
This species was described from a single 9 mm long specimen found in a sample of organic detritus at 34m depth at Bajo de Dentro, Cabo de Palos, Spain, .

References

Aegiridae
Gastropods described in 1990